The bright copper (Paralucia aurifer) is a butterfly belonging to the family Lycaenidae.

Taxonomy
The bright copper was first described by Émile Blanchard in 1848.

Description

The flight season is from December to January.

The wings are dull brown on top with gold-orange triangles in the middle of each wing.

Distribution and habitat
It is found in eastern Australia including New South Wales, eastern Queensland, Victoria, Tasmania and the Australian Capital Territory.

Ecology
The bright copper and the ant species Anonychomyrma nitidiceps form a complex symbiotic relationship on Bursaria spinosa. Butterflies lay their eggs on the underside of the leaves, and the caterpillars feed on the leaves before pupating in the soil at the foot of the plant. The ants excavate chambers in the soil where the caterpillars sleep and later pupate, and accompany the caterpillars when the latter are feeding. They are thought to feed on the caterpillars' secretions.

Gallery

See also
List of butterflies of Tasmania

References

Butterflies described in 1848
Paralucia